Gregory Tarver is an American politician from the state of Louisiana. A member of the Democratic Party, he has served as a member of the Louisiana Senate from the 39th district since 2011. He lives in Shreveport. A candidate in the 2022 Shreveport mayoral election, he received 29% of the vote. This put him into the runoff against Tom Arceneaux, a race that he later lost, with 16,074 votes, or 44% of the vote.

References

Living people
Year of birth missing (living people)
Place of birth missing (living people)
Democratic Party Louisiana state senators
21st-century American politicians
Politicians from Shreveport, Louisiana